Przyłęk may refer to the following places in Poland:
Przyłęk, Lower Silesian Voivodeship (south-west Poland)
Przyłęk, Łódź Voivodeship (central Poland)
Przyłęk, Świętokrzyskie Voivodeship (south-central Poland)
Przyłęk, Subcarpathian Voivodeship (south-east Poland)
Przyłęk, Garwolin County in Masovian Voivodeship (east-central Poland)
Przyłęk, Zwoleń County in Masovian Voivodeship (east-central Poland)
Przyłęk, Greater Poland Voivodeship (west-central Poland)
Przyłęk, Silesian Voivodeship (south Poland)